Funkaso, or Pinkaso, is a Hausa savoury fried dumpling. It is served either as an accompaniment to a main meal or as a snack with Stew.

It is also a northern Nigeria delicacies made with pure wheat powder, flour  or mixture of both eaten with soup, honey or sugar.

Ingredients 

 4 cups wheat flour
 1 tbspoon yeast
 1/2 tspoon salt
 1 tbspoon sugar
 1/2 tspoon baking powder
 Water
 3 cups vegetable oil (for frying)

Preparations 

 Step1; sieve wheat flour in a bowl, add all dry ingredients, give it a good mix add water to mix to get a thick non runny paste, cover and allow to rise for 2 hours in a warm place
 Step2; punch the dough, on a medium heat place the frying pan, then, place dough on a flat plate make a hole ( just like a doughnut ) fry until it turns light brown. Serve with desired soup.

See also
 List of African dishes

References

External links 
 Savoury Funkaso dumplings

Nigerian cuisine
Ghanaian cuisine
Doughnuts